The NHL's Norris Division was formed in 1974 as part of the Prince of Wales Conference.  When the NHL realigned into geographic divisions in 1981, the division moved to the Clarence Campbell Conference, where it comprised the league's Great Lakes and Midwest teams, with the Detroit Red Wings being the only member to remain from the previous season.  The division existed for 19 seasons until 1993.  The division was named in honour of James E. Norris, longtime owner of the Red Wings.  It is the forerunner of the NHL's Central Division. Intense rivalries developed between its constituent teams, which through the 1980s were noted for enforcer-heavy squads that had poor performances – qualifying for the playoffs with .500 points percentages, and achieving no Stanley Cup titles or appearances in the finals – but great local popularity. Despite the division's reputation, the 1985–86 St. Louis Blues made an impressive cinderella run by reaching the Conference Finals where it took the Calgary Flames 7 games to dispatch them following The Monday Night Miracle, and the 1990–91 Minnesota North Stars reached the Stanley Cup finals.

As part of his shtick, ESPN's Chris Berman often refers to the National Football League's NFC North division (previously the NFC Central division) as the Norris Division or "NFC Norris" since the two divisions included teams from three of the same cities: Chicago, Detroit, and Minneapolis–St. Paul.  The Tampa Bay Area was also briefly represented in both divisions simultaneously, during the 1992–93 NHL season. Fans also referred to it as the "Chuck Norris Division" due to its often violent reputation and play-style.

Division lineups

1974–1979
 Detroit Red Wings
 Los Angeles Kings
 Montreal Canadiens
 Pittsburgh Penguins
 Washington Capitals

Changes from the 1973–74 season
 The Norris Division is formed as a result of NHL realignment
 The Detroit Red Wings and Montreal Canadiens come from the East Division
 The Los Angeles Kings and Pittsburgh Penguins come from the West Division
 The Washington Capitals are added as an expansion team

1979–1981
 Detroit Red Wings
 Hartford Whalers
 Los Angeles Kings
 Montreal Canadiens
 Pittsburgh Penguins

Changes from the 1978–79 season
 The Hartford Whalers are granted entry into the NHL from the World Hockey Association (WHA)
 The Washington Capitals move to the Patrick Division

1981–1982
 Chicago Black Hawks
 Detroit Red Wings
 Minnesota North Stars
 St. Louis Blues
 Toronto Maple Leafs
 Winnipeg Jets

Changes from the 1980–81 season
 The Norris Division switches from the Prince of Wales Conference to the Clarence Campbell Conference
 The Hartford Whalers and Montreal Canadiens move to the Adams Division
 The Pittsburgh Penguins move to the Patrick Division
 The Los Angeles Kings move to the Smythe Division
 The Minnesota North Stars and Toronto Maple Leafs come from the Adams Division
 The Chicago Black Hawks, St. Louis Blues, and Winnipeg Jets come from the Smythe Division

1982–1986
 Chicago Black Hawks
 Detroit Red Wings
 Minnesota North Stars
 St. Louis Blues
 Toronto Maple Leafs

Changes from the 1981–82 season
 The Winnipeg Jets move back to the Smythe Division

1986–1992
 Chicago Blackhawks
 Detroit Red Wings
 Minnesota North Stars
 St. Louis Blues
 Toronto Maple Leafs

Changes from the 1985–86 season
 Chicago changes their team name from the Black Hawks to the Blackhawks

1992–1993
 Chicago Blackhawks
 Detroit Red Wings
 Minnesota North Stars
 St. Louis Blues
 Tampa Bay Lightning
 Toronto Maple Leafs

Changes from the 1991–92 season
 The Tampa Bay Lightning are added as an expansion team

After the 1992–93 season
The league was reformatted into two conferences with two divisions each:
 Eastern Conference
 Atlantic Division
 Northeast Division
 Western Conference
 Central Division
 Pacific Division

Regular season Division champions
 1975 – Montreal Canadiens (47–14–19, 113 pts)
 1976 – Montreal Canadiens (58–11–11, 127 pts)
 1977 – Montreal Canadiens (60–8–12, 132 pts)
 1978 – Montreal Canadiens (59–10–11, 129 pts)
 1979 – Montreal Canadiens (52–17–11, 115 pts)
 1980 – Montreal Canadiens (47–20–13, 107 pts)
 1981 – Montreal Canadiens (45–22–13, 103 pts)
 1982 – Minnesota North Stars (37–23–20, 94 pts)
 1983 – Chicago Black Hawks (47–23–10, 104 pts)
 1984 – Minnesota North Stars (39–31–10, 88 pts)
 1985 – St. Louis Blues (37–31–12, 86 pts)
 1986 – Chicago Black Hawks (39–33–8, 86 pts)
 1987 – St. Louis Blues (32–33–15, 79 pts)
 1988 – Detroit Red Wings (41–28–11, 93 pts)
 1989 – Detroit Red Wings (34–34–12, 80 pts)
 1990 – Chicago Blackhawks (41–33–6, 88 pts)
 1991 – Chicago Blackhawks (49–23–8, 106 pts)
 1992 – Detroit Red Wings (43–25–12, 98 pts)
 1993 – Chicago Blackhawks (47–25–12, 106 pts)

Season results

Playoff Division champions
 1982 – Chicago Black Hawks
 1983 – Chicago Black Hawks
 1984 – Minnesota North Stars
 1985 – Chicago Black Hawks
 1986 – St. Louis Blues
 1987 – Detroit Red Wings
 1988 – Detroit Red Wings
 1989 – Chicago Blackhawks
 1990 – Chicago Blackhawks
 1991 – Minnesota North Stars
 1992 – Chicago Blackhawks
 1993 – Toronto Maple Leafs

Stanley Cup winners produced
 1976 – Montreal Canadiens
 1977 – Montreal Canadiens
 1978 – Montreal Canadiens
 1979 – Montreal Canadiens

Presidents' Trophy winners produced
 1991 – Chicago Blackhawks

Norris Division titles won by team

References

 NHL History

National Hockey League divisions